A La Mierda Lo Demás ("Fuck the Rest") is the third album of the band Leusemia. After nearly seven years off the stage, the band decides to return and make a new album but changing its genre. They said "it would not be underground rock, if not progressive rock, because that was the fashion at the time. The real name of the album is called A la mierda lo demás: Asesinando el mito (Fuck the Rest: Killing the Myth)".

Songs 
Introdukción
Un lugar
En una invernal noche de surf
No hay futuro
Cuando las bocas se cierran
Siete años sobre un sueño
Al ramerío!
Por los caminos del alcohol
Oirán tu voz, oirán nuestra voz
Por la senda del pastel
Hablar nada más ke pekatión
El asesino de la ilusión
Al colegio no voy más
Barras malditas
Eskethú, el sionista ke no puso más
La caracola subterránea
Criptetésia infernal
Demolición
Outrodikción
BONUS TRACKS
En una invernal noche de surf/No hay futuro (vivo)
Hastalculo (vivo)
En este disímil lugar (vivo)
Al colegio no voy más (vivo)
Por la senda del pastel (vivo)
Demolición (vivo)

Members 
 Daniel F (vocals and guitar)
 Leo Scoria (bass)
 Kimba Vilis (drums)

References 

1998 albums
Leusemia albums